Zsuzsa Szentmiklóssy is a Hungarian former competitive figure skater. She is the 1966 Prize of Moscow News silver medalist and a two-time Hungarian national champion, having won in 1963 and 1965. She represented her country at three World and three European Championships. Her best result, 11th, came at the 1967 European Championships in Ljubljana, Yugoslavia.

Competitive highlights

References 

20th-century births
Hungarian female single skaters
Living people
Year of birth missing (living people)